Washington Township is the name of two townships in North Carolina:

 Washington Township, Beaufort County, North Carolina
 Washington Township, Guilford County, North Carolina

See also

 Washington Township (disambiguation)

North Carolina township disambiguation pages